is a Japanese watch manufacturer founded in 1950. Established as an independent company in 1950, it became a functional subsidiary of Epson in 2009 before being fully integrated into the company in 2017.

Until it was absorbed into Epson, the Orient Watch Company had primarily marketed mechanical watches (self-winding & hand-winding), but also produced quartz, light-powered (solar) and radio-controlled models. Outside of the main business, the company produced some moving parts and electronic components that were then assembled into Seiko Epson's electronic devices.

Currently, Akita Epson Corporation (formally Akita Orient Precision Instruments Co., Ltd.), a group company of Epson, manufactures all of the Orient movements in-house in Yuzawa, Akita, Japan.

History
The origin of Orient Watch Company dates back to 1901 when Shogoro Yoshida opened a wholesale shop called "Yoshida Watch Shop" in Ueno, Taito, Tokyo, Japan. Yoshida Watch Shop was successful, selling imported pocketwatches. In 1912, Yoshida expanded his business and began producing gold wristwatch cases. In 1920, Toyo Tokei Manufacturing was established, originally producing table clocks and gauges. It was not until 1934 that Toyo Tokei Manufacturing started the production of wristwatches. In 1936, the Hino factory was built in Hino, Tokyo, Japan. For several years, Toyo Tokei Manufacturing boomed at the Hino factory. However, the company shut down in 1949 in the Japanese economic devastation following World War II.

After Toyo Tokei Manufacturing was shut down, Yoshida's wristwatch manufacturing company was reborn in 1950, founded under the name Tama Keiki Company. Tama Keiki Co. continued manufacturing watches at the Hino factory. Orient Watch was able to expand their visibility overseas after a memorandum trade agreement with China in 1955. The Royal Orient went on sale in 1960. Other important watches in the company's history include the "Dynamic" in 1956, "Grand Prix 100" in 1964, "Fineness" (the world's thinnest automatic wristwatch with day and date calendar function for its time) in 1967, and the "Tenbeat" in 1970.

In 2003, the Orient Technical Center (OTC) was established and the assembly of luxury watches began in Ugo, Ogachi, Akita, Japan. In 2004, the high-precision caliber 88700 movement went on sale via the Royal Orient watch line. In 2005, Orient Star Retro-Future collection was launched. In 2010, Orient Watch Co. celebrated its 60th anniversary with a limited edition model. The Royal Orient line was discontinued around 2016, likely to prevent cannibalism between it and fellow Seiko group brands Grand Seiko, and Credor. To celebrate 70 years of the Orient Star line, the Orient Star skeleton watch was introduced with a silicon escapement made using Epson's MEMS technology, which has been used in high end Seiko watches since 2009.

In 2001 Seiko Epson (one of three core companies of the Seiko Group) became the majority shareholder (52%) of the company. Orient Watch became a wholly owned subsidiary of Epson in 2009. After transferring its business to Epson, the company now exists as a dormant company. Epson Sales Japan Corporation markets the Orient watches, while Akita Epson Corporation manufactures them.

Gallery

References

External links 
 

Epson
Manufacturing companies based in Tokyo
Companies formerly listed on the Tokyo Stock Exchange
Fashion accessory brands
Japanese companies established in 1950
Manufacturing companies established in 1950
Japanese brands
Watch brands
Watch manufacturing companies of Japan